Devendra Gangadharrao Fadnavis (born 22 July 1970) is an Indian politician serving as the 9th and current Deputy Chief Minister of Maharashtra since 30 June 2022. He served as the 18th Chief Minister of Maharashtra from 31 October 2014 to 12 November 2019. Having been sworn in at the age of 44, he's the second-youngest Chief Minister in Maharashtra's history after Sharad Pawar. He served a 5-day long second term as Chief Minister during the 2019 Maharashtra political crisis, before resigning on 28 November 2019. He is an activist with the Bharatiya Janata Party and the Rashtriya Swayamsevak Sangh. Fadnavis represents the Nagpur South West constituency in the Maharashtra Legislative Assembly since 2009.

Early life and education
Fadnavis was born in a Marathi Hindu Deshastha Rigvedi Brahmin family to Gangadhar Fadnavis and Sarita Fadnavis in Nagpur.
His father, Gangadhar Fadnavis, served as a member of the Maharashtra Legislative Council from Nagpur. His mother, Sarita Fadnavis, a descendant of the Kaloti family of Amravati, was a former director of the Vidarbha Housing Credit Society.

Fadnavis did his initial schooling at Indira Convent, named after then Prime Minister Indira Gandhi. During the Emergency, Fadnavis' father, being a member of the Jan Sangh, was imprisoned for participating in anti-government protests. Fadnavis subsequently refused to continue his schooling at Indira Convent as he did not want to attend a school named after the Prime Minister he held responsible for imprisoning his father. He was then transferred to the Saraswati Vidyalaya School, Nagpur, where he received most of his schooling.

Fadnavis attended Dharampeth Junior College for his higher secondary.

Fadnavis holds a graduate degree in law from Government Law College, Nagpur University, a post-graduate degree in Business Management and a diploma in Methods and Techniques of Project Management from DSE-German Foundation for International Development, Berlin, Germany.

Political career
Fadnavis began his political career in the mid-nineties. Since that time he served in multiple leadership roles for both his political party and as an elected representative. As a college student, Fadnavis was an active member of the BJP affiliated Akhil Bharatiya Vidyarthi Parishad (ABVP). in the year 1992 at the age of 22 and became a Corporator. 5 years later, in 1997, Fadnavis at 27 became the youngest mayor of the Nagpur Municipal Corporation and became the second-youngest mayor in the history of India.

Fadnavis is representing Nagpur in the Legislative Assembly of Maharashtra State (Vidhan Sabha) since 1999.

Chief Minister of Maharashtra (2014 - 2019) 1st Term
Fadnavis took over as the legislative party leader by the BJP MLAs in the presence of the party's central observers, Union Home minister Rajnath Singh and the party's National General Secretary Jagat Prakash Nadda after being elected to the position. As the leader of the largest party in Maharashtra state assembly, Fadnavis was appointed as the chief minister of Maharashtra on 31 October 2014. His government won a confidence motion by voice vote on 12 November 2014 allowing it to govern.

Flagship projects and initiatives

Jalyukta Shivar Abhiyan 

In 2014, Fadnavis launched the Jalyukta Shivar Abhiyan to address the water shortage issue of Maharashtra's hinterland. The programme was aimed at enabling water percolation and groundwater level improvement across 25,000 drought-affected villages in Maharashtra.

Mumbai Next 
Fadnavis launched ‘Mumbai Next' on 30 January 2015, which was termed a roadmap to convert the country's financial capital into a global financial and entertainment hub. On 6 February, the Fadnavis government held a high-profile conference under the project's umbrella, which was attended by Tata Sons Ltd chairman Cyrus Mistry, Reliance Industries Ltd chairman Mukesh Ambani, and other prominent business leaders.

Police digitisation project 

On 15 September 2015, Fadnavis inaugurated the Maharashtra Crime and Criminal Tracking Network and Systems (CCTNS) in Nagpur, advancing the state's ambition to digitise its police force. The measure was intended to increase transparency, enhance cooperation across police stations, and increase accountability. Fadnavis, who was also the state home minister, stated, "The CCTNS initiative would put all police stations in the state online and paperless."

The initiative acquired pace over the course of six months and has been in operation in Nagpur. After the implementation of CCTNS, Maharashtra became the country's first state to establish India's first crime-criminal tracking network (CCTNS). 43 cyber labs were inaugurated concurrently.

Digital initiatives - launch of cyber labs and village digitisation 
In 2016, under his chief ministership, Maharashtra launched several digital initiatives to mark 70th Independence Day.

Samruddhi Expressway 
Under the Chief Ministership of Fadnavis, the Maharashtra Government proposed an initiative for Nagpur-Mumbai Super Communication Way. This infrastructure was initiated to be built as a part to boost economic development in the rural areas of Maharashtra. This said highway was proposed in 2015, and the pre-construction activities began in 2019. This Mahamarg is built to enable a safe and fast commute between Mumbai and Nagpur along with new towns equipped at the intersections. The expressway will reduce the travel time from 16 hours to 8 hours. This expressway will be consisting of charging stations along its length for Electrical Vehicles (EV). The Samruddhi Mahamarg will open new job and employment doors in the coming years, which will bridge rural and urban gaps. The highway has now been renamed as “Hindu Hrudaysamarat Balasaheb Thackeray Maharashtra Samruddhi Highway” by the government on 22 December 2019, and is now planned to complete the entire work of the project by September 2022.

1% Reservation for orphans in Government jobs 
In 2018, Fadnavis announced a 1% Government Reservation in the open category for orphans education and government jobs in Maharashtra. Maharashtra is the foremost state to obtain such a policy. 

Fadnavis had initiated this policy after an orphan Amruta Karvande, was declined a job despite clearing Maharashtra State Public Service Commission (MPSC) exam. She then met Fadnavis and shared her resentment.

The 1% open category reservation quota shall apply to those children who are granted certificates of being orphans by the Juvenile Homes and the Women and Child Development department. The GR policy states that the Maharashtra Government will create a separate category within the general category which means it will not have to increase its caste reservation quota.

CM Fellowship Scheme
Fadnavis, under his chief ministership, had launched The Chief Minister Fellowship program in 2015. CM Fellowship is an 11-month long fellowship program run by the CM's office, the Government of Maharashtra. This program was launched with the aim of providing administrative experience to the youth. This initiative offers graduates and postgraduates an 11-month stint with the Maharashtra government and carries with its stipend and other perks.

The eligibility criteria to apply for the Chief Minister Fellowship Program is the age between 21 and 26 years, graduation with first-class, one-year work experience, and knowledge of Marathi. This CM Fellowship Program offers an opportunity to work with Government. It allows participation in policymaking, execution, monitoring, and evaluation of programs. It offers opportunities to visit different institutions in the state. Interactions with the geniuses in the industry of art, literature, journalism, entertainment make the fellowship a one-of-the-kind experience. This program provides prospects for growth and learning professionally. It trains fellows for higher education in policy, governance, management, etc. It gives an added advantage for public or private sector careers.

Agricultural Pond
Maharashtra Government launched the 'Magel Tyala Shettale' scheme in 2016 to overcome the drought and sustainable agriculture in the state. Under this 'Magel Tyala Shettale', 108.33 percent of the target was achieved. Fadnavis had been touring drought-prone areas in Maharashtra, meanwhile, farmers in the state had demanded to make few farms available for sustainability in agricultural production and increasing availability of irrigation through watersheds and water conservation of drylands in the state
 
These farms have benefited the farmers during the intermittent rainy seasons. The Government under the Chief Ministership of Fadnavis had decided to deposit a specific amount directly to the beneficiary's account for the farm work, which was deposited when the process began for this Agricultural Pond.

5 Lakh Raincoats Distributed
Likewise, every year, even in 2018, under the Government of Fadnavis in Nashik, the palanquin of Saint Nivruttinath Maharaj, was set on its way to Nashik under the direction and guidance of the worshippers and Warkaris. The devotees at Nashik have a tradition of welcoming the palanquin with enthusiasm in the traditional way. This palanquin comes to Nashik every monsoon season, during Ashadi Wari which falls in the rainy season, Warakaris have to walk in the rains to many places with the palanquin and so Fadnavis decided to distribute 5 Lakh raincoats to the Warkaris across the state.

Chhatrapati Shivaji Maharaj Krishi Sanman Scheme
During the Fadnavis-led Government in 2017, Chhatrapati Shivaji Maharaj Krushi Sanman Yojana was announced by Fadnavis, where a Rs 34,022 Crore loan waiver provided relief to 89 Lakh farmers across the state of Maharashtra. This scheme also benefited crop and medium-term borrowers. 
 
This was called a 'Historic Decision'. Fadnavis had shared that the waiver declared by Maharashtra Government is the highest. After the farmers' 11-day strike, Fadnavis had declared that loans up to Rs 1 Lakh would be waived. But the farmers were unsatisfied and hence the Government of Maharashtra had to take a fresh review of the waiver scheme thus Rs 34,022 were raised as a farm loan waiver.

Marathwada Water Grid Project
In 2019, the Fadnavis-led Governance initiated a scheme to set up a water grid project in Marathwada to address the drought situation. The cost of the scheme was proposed at Rs 4,293 Crore. Fadnavis initiated this water grid project and lifted water from Konkan to the Godavari basin to make droughts in Marathwada "A history".

The water grid and other new schemes were introduced to make Marathwada shed the tag of being a drought-prone region. This region comprises eight districts that have always been a low rainfall region and this grid project aims to create an integrated piped network to supply water for industrial, agricultural, and drinking purposes throughout the year. This ambitious project came to hold due to the COVID-19 Pandemic. As of March 2022, Israel is preparing a plan for the water grid project along with the Maharashtra Government.

Automated Weather Stations 
In 2016, Fadnavis during his ministership initiated to launch of Automated Weather Stations (AWS) to prevent huge losses and provide accurate weather stations for farmers in Maharashtra as early and untimely rains and hailstorms cause enormous losses to farmers. The AWS helps measure the accuracy of rain pattern, humidity & expected rainfall along with information on the best crop for farmers. Close to 2,065 such stations were planned to come up in the state on PPP (public-private partnership) models. Maharashtra State Government had collaborated with a private weather forecasting organization under which a network of AWS was planned to launch. Initially, around 12×12 km area of each taluka was said to have one AWS each. With the capability to record important farming parameters the AWS was said to be a significant role in the life of the farmers in Maharashtra.

Chief Minister of Maharashtra (2019 - 2019) 2nd Term
On 23 November 2019, Fadnavis formed a government with the help of Ajit Pawar of NCP; however, this government only lasted for a few days. During this short period, Fadnavis chaired a climate resilience meeting with representatives of the World Bank, restarted the Chief Minister's refund cell, and sanctioned 5380 crores in aid for farmers.

Deputy Chief Minister of Maharashtra (2022-present) 1st Term 
Following the 2022 Maharashtra political crisis, on 30 June 2022, Fadnavis took oath as the 9th Deputy Chief Minister of Maharashtra with Eknath Shinde as the chief minister.

Awards and recognition

International accolades 
Fadnavis has been conferred with Honorary Doctorate by Osaka City University, Japan. The 120-year-old university then had so far conferred its supreme honorary degree on only 10 distinguished persons in the world and Fadnavis was the first Indian to be conferred with the same for the socio-economic development in Maharashtra.

In June 2018, Fadnavis received the Outstanding Leadership in Development Award by Georgetown University, The United States which he dedicated to the people of Maharashtra.

Best Parliamentarian Award by Commonwealth Parliamentary Association (2002–03)

Controversies

Call for patriotic slogans 
In April 2016, while addressing a rally in Nashik, Fadnavis said that every Indian will have to chant 'Bharat Mata ki Jai', and those who refuse to chant the slogan should not live in the country and instead go to Pakistan or China. The day after these statements, Fadnavis issued a clarification after he found himself embroiled in a controversy over the issue.

Political views 
In November 2020, Fadnavis stated that the view of the BJP is advocacy for Indian reunification in the form of an Akhand Bharat. He declared that "Karachi will be part of India."

Positions held

Organisational

 Ward President, BJYM (1989)
 Office Bearer, Nagpur (west) BJP (1990)
 Nagpur President, BJYM (1992)
 State Vice President, BJYM (1994)
 National Vice President, BJYM (2001)
 General Secretary, BJP, Maharashtra (2010)
 President, BJP Maharashtra (2013)
 In Charge, BJP Goa (2022)
 Organisational President, Rambhau Mhalgi Prabodhini (2021)

Electoral

 Mayor of Nagpur – (1997 to 2001)
 Member, Maharashtra Legislative Assembly - 5 consecutive terms since 1999
 Chief Minister of Maharashtra (2014-2019)
 Leader of the Opposition in Maharashtra Legislative Assembly (1 December 2019 – 29 June 2022)
 Deputy Chief Minister of Maharashtra (30 June 2022 − Incumbent)

Personal life

Fadnavis is married to Amruta Fadnavis, and has one daughter, Divija Fadnavis.

See also

 Devendra Fadnavis ministry (2014–2019)
 Make in Maharashtra
Politics of Maharashtra
Government of Maharashtra

References

Living people
Mayors of Nagpur
Bharatiya Janata Party politicians from Maharashtra
Maharashtra MLAs 2009–2014
1970 births
Savitribai Phule Pune University alumni
Maharashtra MLAs 2014–2019
Chief Ministers of Maharashtra
Chief ministers from Bharatiya Janata Party
Politicians from Nagpur
Maharashtra MLAs 2019–2024